Alan David is a British pop singer of the 1960s and 1970s. He released several singles first for Decca, then for EMI, from 1964 to 1978. David appeared, playing himself as a singer in a band, in the film Gonks Go Beat (1965), and co-hosted the BBC2 TV show Gadzooks, It's The In Crowd in June, 1965 with Lulu.

Discography
Alan David (Decca, 1965)
Life in the City (EMI, 1978)
Alan David (EMI, 1981)

References

Living people
Year of birth missing (living people)
People from Bognor Regis
British pop singers